The Harbin–Tongjiang Expressway, commonly referred to as the Hatong Expressway is an expressway that connects the cities of Harbin, Heilongjiang, China, and Tongjiang, a county-level city in Jiamusi, Heilongjiang. It is completely in Heilongjiang Province.

Also, this expressway has the same route as Asian Highway Network AH33.

The expressway is a spur or auxiliary line of the  G10 Suifenhe–Manzhouli Expressway. The Harbin–Tongjiang Expressway meets the Suifenhe–Manzhouli Expressway at Harbin.

The expressway passes through the cities of Harbin, Jiamusi, Shuangyashan, and ends at Tongjiang, which is a county-level city of Jiamusi.

Detailed Itinerary

References

Asian Highway Network
Chinese national-level expressways
Expressways in Heilongjiang